There have been three versions of George Taylor Richardson Memorial Stadium, a Canadian football stadium located on the campus of the Queen's University in Kingston, Ontario. All three have been the home of the Golden Gaels/Gaels football team. The facilities are named in memory of George Taylor Richardson, a Queen's graduate renowned for his athleticism and sportsmanship who died in the First World War. 

The original stadium built in 1921 was funded by George's brother, James Armstrong Richardson, graduate and Chancellor of Queen's. 

The second stadium was built in 1971. The stadium's bleachers (which recycled steel from the first facility) were deemed structurally unsafe in May 2013, causing 6,500 seats to be removed. Renovations were completed in July 2013, with a new seat capacity of 8,500 with two new end zone seating sections. 

In December 2014, a $20.27 million revitalization was announced that was completed for September 17, 2016 for its inaugural football game. According to the university the facility has "over 8,000" seats, but no specific number is provided by the institution.

History

Original field (1921–1971)

The original field was located on Union Street at the present site of Mackintosh-Corry Hall and its parking lot. It was opened in 1921 on a piece of land bought from a community of nuns. This field hosted the 1922 Grey Cup, where the Golden Gaels defeated the Edmonton Elks 13–1, for their first of three Grey Cups. The official attendance was listed at 4,700. According to Michael Januska's book, Grey Cup Century there were more spectators on hand than the original grandstand could accommodate. "The 10th Grey Cup was the only final played in Kingston, Ontario. The stands at Richardson Stadium were filled to capacity, just under 5,000, with the overflow standing around the field." - Grey Cup Century, pg. 46Franklin Delano Roosevelt received his honorary degree from Queen's on August 18, 1938 at Richardson, where he made a historic speech that was seen as a departure from American isolationism.

Second stadium (1971–2016) 

When a new social sciences complex, Mackintosh-Corry Hall was planned, the original stadium was torn down and relocated to the newly acquired West Campus. Many staff, students, and alumni were very upset about the move, feeling that the stadium belonged in the heart of campus, but the project went ahead anyway and the stadium was built on West Campus in 1971.

In 2013, seating capacity was reduced to 8,500, down from 10,200, because of the temporary bleachers due to construction.

Third stadium (2016–) 
Plans to reconstruct the 40-year-old stadium at the same location were approved in December 2014, with $20.27 million of funding needed. Principal Daniel Woolf stated that the stadium was "desperately in need of revitalization". $17 million was raised from donations, including $10 million from former Gaels football player and current Guelph Gryphons head coach Stu Lang. Construction began on December 5, 2015 and the stadium re-opened for the beginning of the 2016 football season on September 17, 2016.

Soccer
Richardson played host to two World Cup 2006 qualifiers between Canada and Belize in 2004. Canada won both matches 4–0 and progressed to the semifinal stage after Belize had forfeited their right to play a home match due to a lack of infrastructure.

Rugby league 
It hosted the Colonial Cup match between the U.S. Tomahawks and Canada Wolverines on September 19, 2010 which was the first international rugby league match played in Canada since 1995.

Rugby union 
On June 9, 2012, Canada played the United States in a friendly match.  Canada won 28–25 in front of 7,521 spectators.

References

External links

 Official website

Queen's University at Kingston
Canadian football venues in Ontario
Sports venues in Kingston, Ontario
Athletics (track and field) venues in Ontario
Soccer venues in Ontario
Rugby league stadiums in Canada
Rugby union stadiums in Ontario
University sports venues in Canada
1971 establishments in Ontario
Sports venues completed in 1971
College football venues